Mackenziurus is a genus of phacopid trilobites from the Silurian containing several species, including four named after members of the American punk band the Ramones.

Species 
The type species is M. reimeri, described by G.D. Edgecombe and B.D.E. Chatterton in 1990. The species named for members of the Ramones, all named by J.M. Adrain and G.D. Edgecombe in 1997, are:
 M. joeyi, named after Joey Ramone
 M. johnnyi, named after Johnny Ramone
 M. deedeei, named after Dee Dee Ramone
 M. ceejayi, named after C. J. Ramone
Additional Mackenziurus species include:
 M. lauriae Gass, Edgecombe, Ramsköld, Mikulic & Watkins, 1992
 M. emielityi Gass, 1999

See also 

List of organisms named after famous people (born 1900–1949)
List of organisms named after famous people (born 1950–present)

References 

Encrinuridae genera
Fossil taxa described in 1990
Silurian trilobites
Trilobites of North America
Paleozoic life of the Northwest Territories
Paleozoic life of Nunavut